Vamsanikokkadu  is a 1996 Telugu-language drama film directed by Sarath. It stars Nandamuri Balakrishna, Ramya Krishna, Aamani, and music composed by Koti. It was produced by Sivalenka Krishna Prasad under the Sridevi Movies banner. The film was recorded as a Hit at the box office.

Plot
The film begins with Raja the beloved son of a tycoon Chakrapani whom he indulges and allows to spend his life frolicking. Once, Raja clashes with a plucky lady Radhabai and contretemps goes on. Besides, Kotilingam a business ally of Chakrapani conducts manipulations and also schemes to slay his associate via his son Giri. Raja breaks the ploy, sentences Giri, and Chakrapani blackballs him. Consequently, Ranga Rao a trustworthy worker slaps him with a shoe. As a result, Ranga Rao victimizes Kotilingam's avenge and his leg is amputated. Bhaskar the son of Ranga Rao is in love with Chakrapani's daughter Nirmala. Destiny makes Bhaskar take up his father's post in the factory. However, Raja promises Nirmala to preside over an event to put Bhaskar's talent before the world.

In the interim, Raja moves to the next town on a business deal when he is attacked by Kotilingam's men and acquainted with vainglory Sirisha. Before leaving she gives a puzzle to Raja to find her whereabouts. In return, he views a lot of turmoil Nirmala is severely injured and riots are acted against Chakrapani at the workers' colony. Forthwith, he rushes where he spots Bhaskar dead and all accuse Chakrapani as the murderer. During his absence, Chakrapani gazed at Nirmala's love affair and hits hard Bhaskar. The same night, he is slaughtered by some goons. Jointly, Nirmala is wounded while absconding. Presently, Raja decides to undertake atonement and penalty for his father's cruelty. So, goes as a foster to Ranga Rao & his wife Lakshmi. Since then, Raja accepts their liabilities and joins as a worker in the factory. Beholding it, Radha Bai is fond of him. Though Lakshmi treats him like feces, he thresholds it with patience.

Moreover, he files a case against Chakrapani that who is the main convict in Bhaskar's case. Kotilingam artifices in that plight by bailing out Chakrapani. Further, as a surprise, Sirisha debuts as his daughter and desires to possess Raja. Now she convinces Chakrapani to post her as chairperson of the company for retrieving Raja. Therefrom, Sirisha moves several pawns to coerce him and is accelerated up to lock down. Plus, Sirisha tricks and snares Bhaskar's sister Rukmini by Raja's cousin Vishnu. The state of affairs gets worse when workers struggle hard for survival still Raja stands firm. At that point, Rukmini conceives, Raja perceives the entire episode and rages at Sirisha when she reforms. Shortly, he whips out Vishnu against all and arranges the wedlock. On the eve, Kotilingam's men onslaught when Rukmini recognizes one of them as a homicide of Bhaskar. Raja catches hold of them and divulges the actuality. Indeed, Kotilingam slain Bhaskar on behalf of Chakrapani. Parallelly, Chakrapani & Lakshmi also overhear and repent. At last, Raja ceases the baddies. The movie ends on a happy note with the marriage of Raja and Radhabai.

Cast

Nandamuri Balakrishna as Raja
Ramya Krishna as Radha Bai
Aamani as Sirisha
Satyanarayana as Chakrapani
Kota Srinivasa Rao as Kotilingam
Brahmanandam as Appaji
Babu Mohan as Vinayakam
Mallikarjuna Rao as Chidambaram
Tanikella Bharani as Yadagiri
Rakhee as Giri
Chalapathi Rao as Manager
Vijaya Rangaraju as Rowdy
M. Balaiyah as Ranga Rao
Raja Ravindra as Murali
Sanjay Asrani as Bhaskar
Sivaji Raja as Vishnu
Kota Shankar Rao as Lawyer
Bhemiswara Rao as Judge
Jaya Bhaskar as Lawyer
Narsingh Yadav as Narsingh
Jayanthi as Lilavathi
Annapurna as Lakshmi 
Aruna Sri as Nirmala
Madhurima as Rukmini
Jayalalita as Ammaji 
Kalpana Rai 
Y. Vijaya as Andallu

Music 
The music was composed by Koti. The soundtrack was released by the Supreme Music Company.

References

1996 films
1990s Telugu-language films
Indian action drama films
Films directed by Sarath
Films scored by Koti
1990s action drama films